The UEFA Women's Euro 2009 final was an association football match on 10 September 2009 at the Olympic Stadium in Helsinki, Finland, to determine the winner of UEFA Women's Euro 2009. The match was won by the defending champions Germany, who earned their fifth consecutive European title – and seventh in total – with a 2–6 win over England.

Background

England

England leading up to the tournament had only lost just once in their 11 matches and were quietly optimistic about reaching the final.

They were placed in Group C, along with Sweden, Italy and Russia. Initially England had a rocky start losing to Italy 2-1. Results slowly improved starting with a win against Russia. The following match was a tie with Sweden which was enough to put England into the quarter finals.

In the quarter finals a Eniola Aluko brace was enough to defeat the hosts Finland. In the semi finals England defeated the Netherlands in extra time thanks to a Jill Scott header.

Germany

Germany were placed in Group B with Norway, France and Iceland. Germany started in the group in dominant fashion with a 4-0 victory over Norway. The second group game was followed by a 5-1 victory over France. Germany won its final match 1-0 against Iceland.

Germany defeated Italy in the quarter finals in a close fought match 2-1. In the semi finals Germany comfortably beat Norway 3-1. Germany reached the final as overwhelming favourites.

Match

Summary

Germany dominated England and took a 2-0 after 21 minutes when Birgit Prinz and then Melanie Behringer scored.

England regrouped and Karen Carney halved the deficit after just two minutes from Behringer's goal.

Germany regained the lead after six minutes in the second half when a shot by Simone Laudehr was saved from the post with the ball ending up on the feet of Kim Kulig who scored in an empty net.

England fought valiantly again four minutes later, when Carney received a pass from Kelly Smith, who turned around and scored leaving the game at 2-3 goal.

England pushed forward in search of a goal but further the goals in the last half hour of by Inka Grings and Prinz  making the score 2-6.

Match details

Aftermath

With Germany's victory it marked the fifth title in a row and 19 games against England without defeat. Faye White stated "We can hold our heads high".

England manager Hope Powell claimed she wasn't disappointed after losing the final. Jill Scott was a member of the squad that lost in the 2009 final. Thirteen years later she would win the UEFA Women's Championship in  2022, also playing Germany in the final. In 2022 Kelly Smith describes the disappointing performance as one her great regrets in her career.

References

External links
Official tournament website

Final
2009
2009
2009
September 2009 sports events in Europe